Q72 may refer to:
 Q72 (New York City bus)
 Hayfork Airport, in Trinity County, California, United States
 Al-Jinn, the 72nd surah of the Quran